Min Chen is an Australian plant physiologist.  She was born in China and educated in Northeast Normal University China - BSc in 1984 and MSc in 1987 and received her PhD in 2003 from The University of Sydney Australia.  She is a full professor and Australian Research Council Future Fellow in the School of Biological Sciences at the University of Sydney. Her research is primarily concerned with elucidating the molecular and biochemical mechanism of the energy-storing reactions in photosynthetic organisms, especially the function of novel photopigments in oxygenic photosynthetic bacteria.

Research
Her research found that chlorophyll f has an absorption maximum at 706nm in vitro, which suggests that oxygenic photosynthesis can be extended even further into the infrared region, which may open up associated bioenergy applications. Red-shifted chlorophylls could be used extend light capture in crop plants.   Chen is the University of Sydney node leader of Australian Research Council Centre of Excellence for Translational Photosynthesis. The function of Chlorophyll f in photosynthetic reactions is uncertain and the ecological distribution of chlorophyll f remains unknown.

Awards
In October 2011, Chen was awarded the Science Minister’s Prize for Life Scientist of the Year, for her role in discovering a new form of chlorophyll, called chlorophyll f. In 2013 she was recipient of the Robin Hill Award of the International Society for Photosynthesis Research and in the same year awarded the Peter Goldacre Award by the Australian Society of Plant Scientists.

References

Further reading
 Chen M, Chlorophyll modifications and their spectral extension in oxygenic photosynthesis, Annu. Rev. Biochem. 83, 317-340(2014) .
 Chen M, Blankenship RE, Expanding the solar spectrum used by photosynthesis, Trends Plant Sci. 16, 427-431(2011) .
 Schliep M, Crossett B, Willows RD, Chen M, 18O-labelling of chlorophyll d in acaryochloris marina reveal chlorophyll a and molecular oxygen are precursors, J. Bio. Chem. 285, 28450-28456(2010) .
 Chen M, Floetenmeyer M and  Bibby TS, Supramolecular organization of phycobiliproteins in the chlorophyll d-containing cyanobacterium Acaryochloris marina, FEBS Lett. 583, 2535-2539 (2009) 
 Swingley WD, Chen M, Cheung PC, Conrad AL, Dejesa LC, Hao J, Honchak BM, Karbach LE, Kurdoglu A, Lahiri S, Mastrian SD, Miyashita H, Page L, Ramakrishna P, Satoh S, Sattley WM, Shimada Y, Taylor HL, Tomo T, Tsuchiya T,  Wang ZT, Raymond J, Mimuro M, Blankenship RE, and. Touchman JW, Genome expansion in the chlorophyll d-producing cyanobacterium Acaryochloris marina, Proc. Natl. Acad. Sci. U.S.A. 105, 2005-2010 (2008) 
 Kühl M, Chen M, Ralph P, Schreiber U and Larkum AWD, A niche for cyanobacteria containing chlorophyll d, Nature 433 820 (2005) 
 Bibby TS, Nield J, Chen M, Larkum AWD and Barber J, Structure of a photosystem II supercomplex isolated from Prochloron didemni retaining its chlorophyll a/b light harvesting system, Proc. Natl. Acad. Sci. U.S.A. 100 9050–9054 (2003).

External links
  Homepage of Min Chen at the University of Sydney

Living people
1963 births
Chinese emigrants to Australia
University of Sydney alumni
Academic staff of the University of Sydney
Australian women scientists
Plant physiologists
Northeast Normal University alumni